Currituck Shooting Club was a historic shooting club located near Corolla, Currituck County, North Carolina.  The clubhouse was built between 1879 and 1882, and consisted of three connected sections.  The main portion of the clubhouse was a 2 1/2-story frame building sheathed in cedar shake shingles.  Also on the property were a boatmen's house, and boathouse complex, and scattered outbuildings.  The Currituck Shooting Club was formed in 1857, and was the oldest active shooting club in the United States. The complex burned to the ground on March 20, 2003

It was listed on the National Register of Historic Places in 1980.

References

Clubhouses on the National Register of Historic Places in North Carolina
Buildings and structures completed in 1882
Buildings and structures in Currituck County, North Carolina
National Register of Historic Places in Currituck County, North Carolina